James Toback is an American screenwriter and film director. He was nominated for the Academy Award for Best Original Screenplay in 1991 for Bugsy. He has directed films including The Pick-up Artist, Two Girls and a Guy and Black and White.

In 2018, the Los Angeles Times reported that 395 women had accused Toback of sexual harassment or assault over a 40-year period. Toback denied all the allegations. In 2022, thirty-eight women filed a lawsuit in New York accusing him of sexual abuse.

Early life

Toback was born and raised in Manhattan, New York City, the only child of Irwin Lionel Toback and Selma Judith (née Levy). His father was vice president of Dreyfus Corporation. His mother was a president of the League of Women Voters and a moderator of political debates on NBC. His grandfather, Joseph Levy, was the founder of a clothing chain and real estate empire. Toback grew up in The Majestic with his parents, who lived four floors below his grandfather. He befriended future film producer, Ed Pressman, who lived in the same building and later produced Tobeck's film, Harvard Man.

Toback graduated summa cum laude from Harvard University in 1966. He was an editor for The Harvard Crimson.

He spent 3 years teaching English at City College of New York and developed a gambling addiction.

An assignment from Esquire to write about football great and actor Jim Brown led to Brown's invitation to host Toback for an extended stay in Brown's Hollywood Hills home. Brown said that "along with both of us liking girls, I just like his intellect." Toback wrote a book about his experiences as Brown's house guest, Jim: The Author's Self-Centered Memoir of the Great Jim Brown (1971), which Salon described as "essentially a series of wild parties and orgies". Sociologist Calvin C. Hernton reviewed the book for The New York Times and wrote, "James Toback reveals as much about himself in this book as he does about his subject, Jim Brown."

Film career

Toback's first major film success was with writing the semi-autobiographical The Gambler, released in 1974. He credits actress and friend Lucy Saroyan, his literary agent Lynn Nesbit, and Nesbit's contact in film Mike Medavoy with getting his the script to director Karel Reisz and then to Paramount Pictures. For a year, Toback attached himself to Reisz "as his acolyte" in "the perfect mentor-protegé relationship," and he later described Reisz as "my one-man film school."

Toback's directorial début was the 1978 film Fingers, with Harvey Keitel. In her review of Fingers, film critic Pauline Kael wrote of Toback's "true moviemaking fever." Toback followed Fingers with Love and Money in 1982, Exposed in 1983, The Pick-up Artist in 1987, and the documentary The Big Bang in 1989.

In 1991, he wrote the screenplay for Bugsy, which won the 1991 Los Angeles Film Critics Association award for best screenplay of the year and was nominated for both the Academy Award for best original screenplay and for the Golden Globe best screenplay award.

Filmmaker Nicholas Jarecki examined Toback in a 2005 documentary The Outsider: A Film about James Toback.

Toback's documentary Tyson, which he directed and co-produced, was featured at the 2008 Cannes Film Festival, winning a prize in the festival's Un Certain Regard section. That film was nominated for best documentary awards in several United States competitions.

In 2009, the San Francisco International Film Festival selected Toback for its annual Kanbar Award for excellence in screenwriting.

Over his career, Toback's film direction has ranged from the large-scale and spectacular Exposed to the small-scale and single-setting Two Girls and a Guy, one of three Toback films that cast Robert Downey Jr in a featured role. The Oldenburg International Film Festival selected Toback and his work for its 2008 "Retrospective." Other directors have since re-made two Toback films. French director Jacques Audiard's 2005 remake of Fingers as The Beat That My Heart Skipped won numerous Best Film awards. English director Rupert Wyatt re-made The Gambler in 2014.

Critical reception

Film executive Richard Albarino is quoted as saying of Toback, "He never wrote or made anything he hadn't experienced first. He can't write fiction; he can only write diaries and dramatize them."

Owen Gleiberman, chief film critic for Variety, called Toback's 2017 An Imperfect Murder "a thrift-shop psychological X-ray that demands to be taken on its own Tobackian terms. But even on those terms, it spends too much time telling us things that it should be showing us."

Critic Roger Ebert, who panned The Pick-up Artist but praised Toback's other films, said of Toback that as a director, "He's alive. He's in your face. He's trying. He's trying to do something amazing. And to see somebody trying to do that even if they don't always succeed is much more interesting than to see somebody who is not even trying to do it in the first place."

Film historian and longtime friend, David Thomson, noted that "Jim is a member of a generation of young men who fell upon film with enormous creative excitement and did some very, very good work that has had a profound impact on cinema... But I do think that in that work in general, there is too much ignorance about how women see and feel the world and too little place for women in the work."

Sexual misconduct allegations

Toback has been accused of sexually harassing young women.

An article in a 1989 issue of Spy magazine detailed how Toback would "hang out on the streets of the Upper West Side in New York City, and approach women. According to the story, he would in rapid-fire fashion tell them that he was a Hollywood director and offer to show them his Directors Guild of America card. The pitch invariably ended up with an invite to meet privately—sometimes at an outlandishly late hour—to talk about appearing in one of his films". The article, attributed to a pseudonym byline, was actually written by two women who had their own alleged encounters with Toback.

A 2002 Salon article noted Toback's reputation as a womanizer and pickup artist.

On October 22, 2017, Los Angeles Times columnist Glenn Whipp reported that 38 women have accused Toback of sexual harassment or assault. Toback denied these allegations, saying he had not met the women, or that if he had, it "was for five minutes" about which he had "no recollection". The alleged harassment occurred at meetings framed as interviews or casting auditions in places such as hotel rooms, movie trailers, or a public park where Toback asked questions pertaining to the women's sex lives and rubbed his crotch on them or masturbated. Accusers include actresses Rachel McAdams, Selma Blair, Terri Conn, Caterina Scorsone, Julianne Moore, Becky Wahlstrom, and musician Louise Post. Toback claimed he was taking medication at the time of the alleged assaults that made it "biologically impossible" for the alleged actions to occur. In January 2018, Whipp reported that since the Times published its article in October 2017, a total of 395 women contacted the newspaper and said that Toback had sexually harassed them. The accounts stretch over a 40-year period. Toback has denied all these allegations as well.

In April, 2018, Los Angeles County prosecutors declared they would not be pressing any charges against Toback. In one case the victim did not turn up for an interview, and the rest were beyond the statute of limitations.  Two of the declined cases involved misdemeanors, three involved felonies.

David Thomson, after the accusations came out, included a chapter about his 40 year friendship with Toback in his book Sleeping With Strangers: How the Movies Shaped Desire (2019), which explored the dominance of male desire in cinema.

In December 2022, a civil lawsuit was filed against Toback through the New York state Supreme Court. The lawsuit involves all 38 of his original accusers.

Personal life
Toback is married to Stephanie Kempf, who had edited Toback's first documentary The Big Bang in 1989. Toback had an early and brief first marriage to Consuelo Sarah Churchill Vanderbilt Russell.

Filmography

Documentary films

Acting roles
Exposed (1983) ... Leo Boscovitch
Alice (1990) ... Professor Davis
Bugsy (1991) ... Gus Greenbaum
Black and White (1999) ... Arnie Tishman
Death of a Dynasty (2003) ... Lyor Cohen
When Will I Be Loved (2004) ... Professor Hassan Al-Ibrahim Ben Rabinowitz
The Outsider (2005) ... Himself (Documentary)
Mississippi Grind (2015) ... Tony Roundtree

References

External links

 
 Director James Toback on the Charlie Rose Show
 In-depth interview with Toback about "Tyson" at everhip.com
 Vanity Fair: "A Hollywood Mis-Education"

1944 births
American male screenwriters
Harvard College alumni
Living people
Writers from New York City
Film directors from New York City
20th-century American Jews
Screenwriters from New York (state)
21st-century American Jews